Tadeusz Nowicki (born 7 July 1946) is a former professional tennis player from Poland.

Biography

Career
Born in Łódź, Nowicki was a five time national champion.

He competed regularly at the French Open and Wimbledon Championships. His best performance came at the 1971 French Open, where he made the fourth round, with wins over Jim McManus, Vladimir Korotkov and Frew McMillan. In the fourth round he lost in four sets to eventual finalist Ilie Năstase.

On the Grand Prix circuit he made it to the semi-final stage once, at Nice in 1973. En route he defeated a young Björn Borg. He was a quarter-finalist at the 1974 Austrian Open Kitzbühel.

Nowicki had a long Davis Cup career for Poland, featuring in a total of 25 ties across 16 years. For his service to the Polish team he was awarded a Davis Cup Commitment Award. He also represented Poland in the 1978 Nations Cup.

Coaching
A former Davis Cup captain, Nowicki lives in Germany and for many years has been head coach of TGF Bochum.

See also
List of Poland Davis Cup team representatives

References

External links
 
 
 

1946 births
Living people
Polish male tennis players
Sportspeople from Łódź
Polish emigrants to Germany